Shopping Park station, formerly known in English as Gouwugongyuan station, is a station on Line 1 and Line 3 of the Shenzhen Metro. The Line 1 platforms opened on 28 December 2004 and the Line 3 platforms opened on 28 June 2011. It is located underneath the junction of Fuhua Road, Yitian Road and Mintian Road in Futian District, Shenzhen, China. The station takes its name from COCO Park, a major shopping mall. It also has underground connections to Futian station via Link City and the Ping An Finance Centre.

Station layout

Exits

References

External links

 Shenzhen Metro Shopping Park Station (Line 1) (Chinese)
 Shenzhen Metro Shopping Park Station (Line 1) (English)
 Shenzhen Metro Shopping Park Station (Line 3) (Chinese)
 Shenzhen Metro Shopping Park Station (Line 3) (English)

Railway stations in Guangdong
Shenzhen Metro stations
Futian District
Railway stations in China opened in 2004
Railway stations located underground in China